Kopelson is a surname. Notable people with the surname include:
 Arnold Kopelson (1935–2018), American film producer
 Kevin Kopelson (born 1960), American literary critic and author